Mamadou Camara (born 7 February 2001) is a French professional footballer who plays as a forward. He plays for  club Quevilly-Rouen.

Career
Camara made his professional debut with Troyes in a 1–0 Coupe de France loss to Auxerre on 19 January 2021. He signed his first professional contract with the club on 7 July 2021.

On 21 July 2022, Camara signed a three-year contract with Quevilly-Rouen.

Personal life
Born in France, Camara is of Malian descent.

References

External links
 

Living people
2001 births
French sportspeople of Malian descent
Sportspeople from Aubervilliers
Black French sportspeople
French footballers
Footballers from Seine-Saint-Denis
Association football forwards
ES Troyes AC players
US Quevilly-Rouen Métropole players
Ligue 1 players
Championnat National 3 players